The PZL W-3 Sokół (English: "Falcon") is a medium-size, twin-engine, multipurpose helicopter developed and manufactured by Polish helicopter company PZL-Świdnik, now owned by Leonardo. It was the first helicopter entirely designed and produced in Poland.

Development

Origins

During 1973, work commenced upon what would become the W-3 Sokół at PZL Świdnik; design work was performed by an in-house team led by aeronautical engineer Stanisław Kamiński. A major influence on the design was the perceived demands from both military and civilian aviation across the Soviet Union, which was envisioned to serve as the major operator of the type. On 16 November 1979, the Sokół conducted its maiden flight. Following an intensive test programme, type certification for the helicopter was received from aviation authorities in Poland, Russia, the United States and Germany.

During May 1993, certification of the Sokol to Federal Aviation Administration (FAA) FAR Part 29 standards was granted; it was followed by the receipt of German certification during December of that year. During 1985, low rate production of the Sokół commenced. In June 1996, the 100th Sokół was completed by the company.

Huzar derivative
During the 1990s, PZL-Świdnik heavily pursued the development of an envisioned Huzar battlefield helicopter, which was to be based on the airframe of the W-3 Sokol and would have eventually involved the manufacture of 100 such attack helicopters under a tentative $350 million contract for the Polish Army. While the programme was initiated by the company, it was heavily afflicted by repeated setbacks and delays as PZL-Świdnik's financial state worsened as well as the firm often waiting for years for development funds to be issued by the Polish government with which it could formally launch the next phase of development. When a contract for the helicopter's avionics and weapon systems was awarded within a government memorandum of understanding (MoU) to an Israeli consortium, consisting of armaments manufacturer Rafael Advanced Defense Systems and defense electronics company Elbit Systems, making them the intended supplier for both the missiles and avionics for the helicopter.

During 1998, the Polish Council of Ministers issued its recommendation for the launch of a new tender in support of the envisioned Huzar. Specifically, the tender sought an avionics and weapons systems integrator for the new rotorcraft, potentially replacing the originally selected Israeli consortium due to alleged irregularities involved in the prior arrangement's awarding. American firm Boeing, who led their own bid involving in excess of 20 separate companies, represented Elbit's chief competitor for the integration contract; at one point, it appeared that political changes to the competition had made Boeing the favourite to win the contract. While Rafael's NT-D anti-tank missile was selected, this was subject to the successful completion of several test launches; if it failed, rival bids from Boeing for the AGM-114 Hellfire, British firm GEC-Marconi with the Brimstone and the Franko-German company Euromissile's HOT 3 missile. The Israeli Government resisted breaking up its consortium for a separate avionics integration contract, stated it would refuse to release the NT-D missile unless it was also awarded the avionics bid, but reportedly softened on this stance.

However, during mid-1999, the Polish government's plans for the Huzar helicopter were entirely abandoned, effectively ending development of the derivative immediately. In its place, a smaller fleet of W-3 Sokol, modified for the support role, was to be adopted in the short term instead. Invitations for bids for the upgrading of 50 rotorcraft, including the adoption of new rotor blades, more powerful engines, extra fuel tanks and additional armaments, was issued thereafter. At the time, Polish Prime Minister Jerzy Buzek stated that, for the long term requirement, a new tender for attack helicopter was to be issued by the end of June that year, and "we expect a decision in October or November"; the envisioned competition was to be contested by the Italian Agusta A129 Mangusta, the American Bell AH-1W/Z Super Cobra and Boeing AH-64 Apache, the European Eurocopter Tiger and South African Denel Rooivalk attack helicopters. Poland ultimately chose to pursue a relatively modest stopgap plan to upgrade its existing Mil Mi-24 fleet with Israeli-built equipment.

Further development
During the early 2000s, PLZ Swidnik issued an offer for the upgrade of 12 Sokols previously operated by the Polish Air Force in the training role, converting them to perform the search and rescue mission instead; amongst the changes involved was the installation of Rockwell Collins-built ARC-210 transceivers and the adoption of new night-vision goggles (NVG)-compatible cockpits. In 2006, this offer was met with a corresponding contract, which would ultimately led to the production of an improved model of the rotorcraft, designated as the W-3PL Gluszec; in addition to the above improvements, a new flight control system and upgraded powerplants featuring full authority digital engine control (FADEC) software, were adopted, along with various changes to the communication, navigation and self-protection systems. The variant, which had been developed partially based upon combat experience gained in Iraq, attracted the attention of the Polish land forces, leading to discussions on modernising additional W-3 helicopters to the Gluszec standard. By January 2012, a follow-up order for another four Sokols re-built to the W-3PL configuration had been issued.

During the mid-2000s, it was reported that, as part of a wider proposed industrial partnership between PLZ Swidnik and Indonesian aircraft company Indonesian Aerospace (IAe), discussions on the potential outsourcing of manufacturing work on the Sokol helicopter, focused on the airframe and some of the subassemblies, were held; it was also stated that a wider licensing agreement in respect to the Sokol had already been ruled out as IAe were not prepared to accept responsibility for marketing and sales for the helicopter.

Following Anglo-Italian helicopter manufacturer AgustaWestland's acquisition of PZL Swidnik, the W-3 Sokol was incorporated into the new parent company's product line and has continued to be marketed and sold.

Design
The PZL W-3 Sokół  is a medium-size, twin-engine, multipurpose rotorcraft. The helicopter employs a relatively conventional design and construction. It is powered by a pair of Pratt & Whitney Rzeszów-built PZL-10B turboshaft engines; the original powerplant, the PZL-10W, was based on the earlier PZL-10S – a licensed derivative of the Russian-designed Glushenkov TVD-10B turboprop engines which had powered the Polish-built Antonov An-28. Composites are used in the construction of the three-bladed tail and four-bladed main rotors.

The Sokół has been offered in a number of diverse variants and is capable of performing a typical range of helicopter missions, including passenger transport, VIP, cargo, EMS, medevac, firefighting and search and rescue. When used in maritime environments, the rotorcraft is typically outfitted with floats, a transponder, a global positioning system navigation system, night-vision equipment, and a Lucas winch.

Operational history
The first civilian export customer for the W-3A variant of the type was Germany's Federal Police in Saxony.

During 1995, South Korean operator Citiair issued a firm order for the purchase of three transport-orientated W-3A Sokół helicopters. Citiair chose fit various additional equipment on the type, including floats, as two of them were to routinely travel to the island of Ulleungdo, roughly 180 km (110 miles) from the Korean mainland, while the third was to be operated in the nation's more mountainous regions. During the same year, Polish oil company Petrobaltic ordered a single W-3RM Anaconda maritime helicopter, while primarily designed for search and rescue (SAR) duties, it was used by the company for transporting personnel, supplies and equipment to its Baltic oil drilling platforms.

The Polish military has been a key customer for the Sokol. During the mid-1990s, a 15-year modernisation plan called for the procurement of 90 transport-orientated Sokols, along with 100 Huzar battlefield helicopter (a later-cancelled derivative of the Sokol). During the mid-1990s, During early 1996, Poland exchanged a batch of 11 W-3 Sokółs with the neighbouring Czech Republic in exchange for 10 Mikoyan MiG-29. Maritime-orientated W-3RM Anaconda maritime helicopters were adopted by the Polish naval service, who used the type to perform the SAR role.

Since 2003, a batch of four W-3WA helicopters were used by the Independent Air Attack Group of the Polish forces in Iraq in support of coalition operations in the region as a part of Poland's contribution to the Iraq War. In total, eight Polish helicopters were deployed to the region until 2008. during summer 2004, the type participated in the distribution of propaganda leaflets as part of wider efforts to undermine support for Iraqi Shia cleric Muqtada al-Sadr. On 15 December 2004, one Sokol was lost due to an accidental crash-landing near Karbala, killing three personnel onboard and injuring three more. On 18 July, 2006 another helicopter crashed at an air base in Al Diwaniyah, injuring 4 crew and 3 passengers.

Since January 2012, a force of five W-3 Sokol helicopters, along with six Mil Mi-8, have been furnished with a VIP configuration and stationed at Poland's 1st Air Transport Base following a major reshuffle of assets.

Variants

Civil versions
Civil production versions.

W-3 Sokół
Basic civil multi-purpose version, 30 built (excluding prototypes).
W-3A Sokół
Version with FAR-29 certificate. At least 9 civil helicopters built.
W-3AS Sokół
W-3 airframe converted to W-3A standard, 22 converted.
W-3A2 Sokół
Version with two-axis Smith SN 350 autopilot, one built.
W-3AM Sokół
Civil version with floats, 13 built.
W-3 Erka
Ambulance variant, one built in 1988

Military versions

Military production versions.

W-3 / W-3T / W-3P Sokół
Basic (unarmed) transport/passenger variant used by Polish Air Force (6), Navy (2) and Myanmar Air Force (13, inc. two for VIP).
W-3A Sokół
Military transport variant of the W-3A version used by Czech (11) and Philippine Air Force (8). Some of the Czech helicopters were modified for the emergency medical services. Filipino examples can carry M60 machine gun on each side. Iraqi Air Force returned two VIP-configured Sokół to the intermediary company after cancelling the order.
W-3P/S/A VIP Sokół
VIP transport version used by Polish Air Force. Eight built.
W-3W/WA Sokół
Armed version, with twin 23 mm GSz-23Ł cannon and four pylons for weapons used by Polish Land Forces. W-3WA is a variant with FAR-29 certificate. 34 built.
W-3AE Sokół
Medical evacuation version used by Polish Land Forces (AE for "Aero Ewakuacja"). Three W-3WA upgraded.
W-3R Sokół
Medical evacuation version used by Polish Air Force. Two built.
W-3RL Sokół
Land search and rescue version used by Polish Air Force. Six built.
W-3RM  Anakonda
"Anakonda" (en: "Anaconda") Navalized search and rescue version used by Polish Navy. One prototype and eight production aircraft built from 1991 to 2002.
W-3WARM Anakonda
 Modernised search and rescue helicopter for Polish Navy, with upgraded and standardised equipment. Eight helicopters (two W-3 and six W-3RM) upgraded, re-entering service from 2017 to 2020.
W-3PSOT / W-3PPD Gipsówka
"Gipsówka" (en: "Gypsophila") W-3PPD was a flying command centre variant (PPD stands for "Powietrzny Punkt Dowodzenia" – "Airborne Command Post"). In 2006 this variant received new digital battlefield (after modernization helicopter is able to guide artillery equipped with Topaz fire control system) and observation systems and was adopted by Polish Land Forces Aviation under new name W-3PSOT (PSOT stands for "Powietrzne Stanowisko Obserwacji Terenu" – "Airborne Observation Post"). This variant is equipped with pylons for weapons (same like in W-3W) but has no 23 mm fixed cannon. One built.
W-3RR Procjon
"Procjon" (en: "Procyon") is a radioelectronic reconnaissance version (RR stands for "Rozpoznanie Radioelektroniczne" – "Radioelectronic Reconnaissance"). Three built.
W-3PL Głuszec
"Głuszec" (en: "Capercaillie") is a PZL W-3WA upgrade program to bring armed variant of Sokół up to 21st century standards by including advanced avionic systems (in Glass cockpit configuration) and other changes like FADEC-equipped engines. Avionics include two 10″ MFD displays, single tactical display (maps and Elbit Toplite FLIR), INS/GPS, TACAN, VOR/ILS, DME navigation, HUD, IFF, PNL-3 night vision goggles, HOCAS (Hands on Collective and Stick) control, infrared and radar warning receiver, MIL-STD-1553B data link. Twin 23 mm cannon was replaced by single pilot's controlled 12,7 mm WKM-Bz machine gun with 350 rounds. Designed for Combat Search and Rescue duties. The first prototype (s/n: 360901) was tested by the Land Forces aviation in 2009. Eight W-3WA are to be upgraded.

Prototypes and proposals
Prototypes and proposals that were not adopted by armed forces.

W-3B Jastrząb
Proposed armed version with tandem-seat cabin and guided AT rockets.
W-3K/W-3WB Huzar
Proposed armed version with guided ZT3 Ingwe ATGM, FLIR and 20 mm GA-1 cannon with helmet-mounted sight. Modification by Kentron (Denel) company in 1993 tested in South Africa. Some elements like hardpoint were used in serial W-3W/W-3WA variant. One built.
W-3L Sokół Long
Proposed stretched version seating up to 14 passengers, mockup only.
W-3MS/W-3WS Sokół
Proposed gunship version.
W-3U Salamandra
Armed version, with avionics and armament from Mi-24W. Only one built, later converted into transport variant and sold to Myanmar.
W-3U-1 Aligator
Proposed anti-submarine version.
W-3PL/N
Proposed navalised version of W-3PL with folding rotor, radar, dipping sonar, air-to-surface missiles and torpedoes.

Operators

Algerian Air Force

Corporación Nacional Forestal

Czech Air Force 

Myanmar Air Force

Philippine Air Force 

Polish Air Force 
Polish Border Guard
Polish Land Forces 
Polish Navy
Polish Police

Fire Department of Choong Nam

Uganda National Police (1 on order)

Former operators
 
 Landespolizei)

Helibravo Aviação 

Police of Ras Al-Khaimah

Helibravo a W-3A2 (serial number 370508) and a W-3AM (370705).
Hispánica de Aviación owns 9 aircraft: 5 W-3AS, 3 W-3AM and a W-3A.
Xunta de Galicia for firefighting operations.

Specifications (W-3A)

See also

References

Citations

Bibliography

 Fiszer, Michał and Gruszczyński, Jerzy. "Anakonda snakes into service". Air International, March 2021, Volume 100, Issue 3. pp. 42–43. .
 Jackson, Paul. Jane's All The World's Aircraft 2003–2004. Coulsdon, UK: Jane's Information Group, 2003. .
 Ripley, Tim. Middle East Air Power in the 21st Century. Casemate Publishers, 2010. .
 Simon, Jeffery. Poland and NATO: A Study in Civil-military Relations. Rowman & Littlefield, 2004. .

External links

 PZL Świdnik Web Site
 List of all W-3 helicopters used by Polish Air Force
 PZL W-3 Production List
 PZL W-3 Variant Briefing
 PZL W-3 Program History
 PZL W-3 Photo Gallery
 PZL W-3AE Sokół gallery at Plastikowe.pl magazine
 W-3 Sokol Images and Information

1980s Polish military aircraft
1970s Polish helicopters
1980s Polish civil aircraft
Science and technology in Poland
W-3
Military helicopters
Twin-turbine helicopters
Aircraft first flown in 1979